Kanata—Carleton is a provincial electoral district in Ottawa, Ontario which was first contested in the 2018 provincial election.

The riding was created federally with the 2012 redistribution process. That same process was announced by the Ontario government, meaning the provincial ridings will follow a similar boundary division for the 2018 provincial election.  The new riding contains almost all of the portion of the former Carleton—Mississippi Mills located in Ottawa, except for the portion south of Highway 7/Highway 417 that transferred Carleton.  A small fraction came from Nepean—Carleton surrounding the Bridlewood neighbourhood.

Geography 
The riding covers an area within a boundary defined as follows: Western limit of Ottawa starting at Highway 7. NE along Highway 7 to Highway 417. NE along Highway 417 to Maple Grove Road. NE along Maple Grove Road to the Carp River. SE along the Carp River to the SW section of Spearman Lane. NE along Spearman Lane to Terry Fox Drive. SE along Terry Fox to Hope Side Road. NE along Hope Side Road to Richmond Road. N along Richmond Road to West Hunt Club Road. NW to Haanel Drive with Robertson Road. SW along Robertson Road to Eagleson Road. NW along Eagleson Road to March Road, Herzberg Road and March Valley Road to Riddell Road to the interprovincial boundary between Ontario and Quebec. along the boundary to the north limit of the city of Ottawa then SW and SE along the northern and western limits of the city to the point of commencement.

Members of Provincial Parliament

Electoral history

References

External links 
Map of riding for 2018 election

Ontario provincial electoral districts
Provincial electoral districts of Ottawa